The Victor Recording Orchestra was a jazz band led by Jean Goldkette. Founded in 1924, it was considered by Rex Stewart to be the best dance band of its day and the "first original white swing band." It was known for its innovative arrangements and strong rhythm.

Among its members were:

 Bix Beiderbecke
 Steve Brown
 Hoagy Carmichael
 Jimmy Dorsey
 Tommy Dorsey
 Eddie Lang
 Pee Wee Russell
 Frankie Trumbauer
 Joe Venuti
 Bill Rank

Among the band's own arrangers was Russ Morgan; the band also traded arrangements with Fletcher Henderson. The band's most popular records included "After I Say I'm Sorry," "Dinah," "Gimme a Little Kiss, Will Ya, Huh?" and "Lonesome and Sorry." According to Rex Stewart, the primitive recording techniques of the day (for example, bass and snare drums could not be recorded) failed to provide a true record of the band.

American jazz ensembles
Musical groups established in 1924
Musical groups with year of disestablishment missing
Musical groups from the United States with local place of origin missing
1924 establishments in the United States